Notosacantha is a genus of cassidine leaf-beetle with nearly 300 species across the Old World. Among the Cassidinae, this genus has among the most species. They feed on plants and can be very host specific. The biology of most species, even the host plants are unknown. Many species have narrow distributions, especially those from islands in Southeast Asia. Nearly 18 species occur in India and many are difficult to identify from external morphology.

References

External links
 List of species

Cassidinae
Chrysomelidae genera